Trà Lĩnh is a township of Trùng Khánh District, Cao Bằng Province. It is located near the China-Vietnam border and is a road border crossing between the two countries. The Longbang Port control point is located on the Chinese side of the border.

The township was formerly named Hùng Quốc and was the district capital of former Trà Lĩnh District.

References

Populated places in Cao Bằng province
China–Vietnam border crossings
Townships in Vietnam